Progressive Maryland (PM) is a 501(c)(4) nonprofit grassroots advocacy organization.

Its mission is to build the movement to improve the lives of working families in Maryland through outreach, public education, lobbying, direct political action, research, and helping elect progressive candidates to office.

Founded in 2000, it is one of Maryland's largest grassroots advocacy organizations, with more than 100,000 individual members and supporters and 30 affiliated religious, community, and labor organizations.

The group is closely allied with a number of local, regional and national campaigns and coalitions promoting progressive policies and politics. It is also the Maryland state affiliate of People's Action, which has over 50 affiliates in 29 states.

References

External links
 

Four Corners, Maryland
Non-profit organizations based in Maryland
Progressive organizations in the United States
501(c)(4) nonprofit organizations